Radial Road 8, more commonly referred to as R-8, is a network of roads and bridges that altogether form the eighth radial road of Manila in the Philippines. It runs north-south through northern Metro Manila linking the City of Manila with Quezon City, Caloocan, and Valenzuela into the northern provinces of Bulacan, Pampanga, Tarlac, Pangasinan, and La Union. The portion of R-8 between Guiguinto and Balintawak is also designated a component of the Pan-Philippine Highway network (AH26). It also has a spur segment in Quirino Highway from NLEX to its junction with R-7 at Commonwealth Avenue, both in Quezon City.

Route
The road consists of the following segments:

Quezon Boulevard

Between Quezon Bridge over the Pasig River in the district of Quiapo and Lerma Street in Sampaloc, R-8 is known as Quezon Boulevard. It is the main north-south thoroughfare of Quiapo which is also linked to Radial Road 7 (R-7) via a tunnel to Lerma Street.

Alfonso Mendoza Street
Between Lerma Street and Laong Laan Street, R-8 is carried by Alfonso Mendoza Street (formerly Calle Andalucía), the continuation of Quezon Boulevard along the Sampaloc–Santa Cruz border. Past Laong Laan, the street continues unassigned to R-8 up to Lacson Avenue.

Dimasalang Street

Between Lacson Avenue and Blumentritt Road at Sampaloc's border with Quezon City, R-8 is known as Dimasalang Street. It passes the Dangwa flower market at its south end and leads to the Manila North Green Park and the Manila North Cemetery main gate at its north end before merging with Bonifacio Avenue.

A. Bonifacio Avenue

A. Bonifacio Avenue carries R-8 between Blumentritt Road and Epifanio de los Santos Avenue (EDSA). It intersects with Del Monte Avenue and 5th Avenue, a part of Circumferential Road 3 (C-3), before coming to an interchange with EDSA and North Luzon Expressway at the Balintawak Cloverleaf.

North Luzon Expressway

The main segment of R-8 is North Luzon Expressway (NLEx). It leads motorists out of Metro Manila into the Central Luzon provinces of Bulacan and Pampanga passing through Quezon City and Valenzuela. The section of NLEx between the Santa Rita Interchange in Guiguinto and Balintawak Interchange in Quezon City is also the route of the Pan-Philippine Highway (AH26) from the Cagayan Valley Road to EDSA. The road ends at an interchange with the Subic–Clark–Tarlac Expressway in Mabalacat, Pampanga.

Subic–Clark–Tarlac Expressway

NLEx connects to the Subic–Clark–Tarlac Expressway (SCTEX) via Clark Spur Road towards the interchange of SCTEX Main in Mabalacat. SCTEX Main then carries R-8 north towards Tarlac City.

Tarlac–Pangasinan–La Union Expressway

Between Tarlac City and its northern terminus at Manila North Road and Pugo–Rosario Road in Rosario, R-8 is known as the Tarlac–Pangasinan–La Union Expressway (TPLEx). It links the provinces of Tarlac, Nueva Ecija, Pangasinan, and La Union.

R-8 Spur

The segment of Quirino Highway is considered as a spur of R-8, branching from the Novaliches Interchange of NLEX  (one of the main segments of R-8) to its junction with R-7 at Commonwealth Avenue. This is entirely located in Quezon City.

See also
 List of roads in Metro Manila

References

Routes in Metro Manila